Keur-Macene  or Keurmacen is a town and urban commune in the Trarza Region of south-western Mauritania, located on the border with Senegal.

In 2000 it had a population of 6,408.

References

Communes of Trarza Region